Brianna Clark (born 25 May 1995) is an Australian rugby league footballer who plays as a er for the Brisbane Broncos in the NRL Women's Premiership and the Valleys Diehards in the QRL Women's Premiership.

She is a Prime Minister's XIII representative.

Background
Born in Brisbane, Clark was raised in Sarina, Queensland and attended Sarina State High School. Clark played soccer growing up, moving to the United States to play for Indian Hills Community College in Ottumwa, Iowa.

Playing career
In 2017, Clark began playing rugby league for the Mackay Magpies.

In May 2019, she represented Queensland Country at the Women's National Championships. On 11 October 2019, she represented the Prime Minister's XIII in their win over Fiji in Suva.

2020
Clark began the 2020 season playing for Wests in the QRL Women's Premiership. On 19 September, Clark joined the New Zealand Warriors NRL Women's Premiership team. In Round 2 of the 2020 NRL Women's season, Clark made her debut for the Warriors in a 14–28 loss to the Brisbane Broncos.

On 26 October, Clark was named in the Queensland squad for the 2020 Women's State of Origin but did not play in their 24–18 win over New South Wales.

2021
In 2021, Clark joined the Valleys Diehards in the QRL Women's Premiership.

2022 
In October she was selected for the New Zealand squad at the delayed 2021 Women's Rugby League World Cup in England.

References

External links
New Zealand Warriors profile

1995 births
Living people
Australian female rugby league players
Rugby league second-rows
New Zealand Warriors (NRLW) players